The bolus or baulus is a brioche pastry based on flour, milk, butter, cassonade and raisins, in spiral shape. It is a Belgian and especially Brussels speciality, similar to Zeeuwse bolus but with raisins.

References 

Buns
Belgian cuisine
Sweet breads